Juan Ignacio Basaguren García (born 21 July 1944) is a Mexican former professional footballer who played as a midfielder.

Career
Basaguren played for Atlante F.C. during the 1970 71 Primera season.

Basaguren competed for Mexico at the 1968 Summer Olympics and at the 1970 FIFA World Cup. In 1970, he became the first ever substitute player to score in a World Cup match, against El Salvador.

International goals
Scores and results list Mexico's goal tally first.

References

External links
 
 
 

1944 births
Living people
Footballers from Mexico City
Mexican people of Basque descent
Mexico international footballers
Olympic footballers of Mexico
Footballers at the 1968 Summer Olympics
1970 FIFA World Cup players
Atlante F.C. footballers
Liga MX players
Association football midfielders
Mexican footballers